The Essential Bill Withers is a 34-track anthology of American recording artist Bill Withers. First released on August 20, 2013, it features all of Withers' notable singles, along with other highlights from the singer's albums for the Sussex and Columbia labels, from 1971's Just as I Am through 1985's Watching You Watching Me and including "Ain't No Sunshine", "Lean on Me", "Use Me", "Lovely Day", and "The Same Love That Made Me Laugh".

Reception 

 Jack Goodstein from Blogcritics says: "His songs are sometimes highly personal, whether he seems to be looking back on his West Virginia boyhood in 'Grandma’s Hands,' or looking for love in the lyrical 'Let Me in Your Life'. He can create a persona to voice his concerns with greater social issues as he does with the alcoholic speaker in the grimly tragic 'Better Off Dead', or the disabled veteran in 'I Can't Write Left-Handed'. But of course it is love in all its forms (especially unrequited, the theme of all the great soulful blues) that is his most common theme."
 Soul Tracks Reviewer Howard Dukes says that: "So hearing the tune on the compilation The Essential Bill Withers brought back some memories. Hearing that song also got me thinking about Withers as a songwriter. Withers is a great lyricist, so it's not surprising that other artists cover his songs. Some of those covers come instantly to mind – the Club Nouveau cover of 'Lean on Me' or Meshell Ndegeocello's cover of 'Who Is He and What Is He to You'. Jon Lucien and Nancy Wilson remade 'Hello Like Before',” and several artists have covered 'Grandma's Hands', including Gil-Scot Heron."

Track listing

Disc one

Disc two

Personnel 
 Mark Larson - Art Direction
 Leo Sacks, Marcia Withers - Compilation Producer 
 Compiled By – Leo Sacks, Marcia Withers 
 Directed By [Project] – Mike Cimicata 
 Mastered By – Mark Wilder

Charts

References 

Bill Withers compilation albums
2013 compilation albums
Columbia Records compilation albums
Legacy Recordings compilation albums